STAR Reading, STAR Early Literacy and STAR Math are standardized, computer-adaptive assessments created by Renaissance Learning, Inc., for use in K–12 education. Each is a "Tier 2" assessment of a skill (reading practice, math practice, and early literacy, respectively) that can be used any number of times due to item-bank technology. These assessments fall somewhere between progress monitoring tools ("Tier 1") and high-stakes tests.

Original meaning
STAR, as an acronym, used to mean "Standardized Test for the Assessment of Reading". This meaning is no longer maintained, as the company has created STAR assessments for skills in domains other than reading. STAR Reading, the first STAR assessment, was originally just "STAR." Since the creation of STAR Math, the original STAR has been renamed to STAR Reading. Confusion may also arise with California's STAR (Standardized Testing and Reporting) or the Supplementary Tests of Achievement in Reading published by the New Zealand Council for Educational Research, but these are not the same assessments.

Purpose
The purpose of the STAR assessments is to provide information to teachers about student growth and achievement in grades 1–12. Students take the assessment and it is scored automatically by the software. Teachers and administrators are able to view and print a number of reports at the individual, classroom, and grade level in order to monitor progress. Teachers can then tailor instruction to individuals and to high-stakes testing requirements.

STAR assessments

Each assessment provides estimates of students' skills and comparisons of students' abilities to national norms. Each is intended to aid with developing curriculum and instruction by providing feedback about student, classroom, and grade level progress. The software reports grade equivalents, percentile ranks, and normal curve equivalents.

Each assessment is standardized and highly correlated to other assessments. Thus, the results predict achievement on other standardized tests. For more on the reliability and validity of these assessments, see below.

All STAR products were available as stand-alone and network software, but now the company strongly advertises the web-based Renaissance Place version.

STAR Reading
The purpose of STAR Reading is to assess students' reading skills. The assessment provides an approximate measure of each students' reading level. The company claims that students can complete the assessment in less than 10 minutes.

STAR Early Literacy
The purpose of STAR Early Literacy is to assess students' early literacy skills in preparation for reading. SEL identifies student reading levels (e.g. Emergent Reader) and provides student performance results for pre-K through third grade students. The company claims that students can complete the assessment in less than 10 minutes.

STAR Math
The purpose of STAR Math is to assess students' mathematics skills. The assessment provides an approximate measure of each students' math level. The company claims that students can complete the assessment in less than 12 minutes.

STAR Spanish 
The purpose of STAR Spanish is to assess students' Spanish skills. The assessment consists of reading comprehension for independent readers from grade levels 1–5. However, it can be administered to Spanish speaking students at grade levels 1–12. STAR Spanish tracks students' Spanish reading level, ZPD for independent reading practice of Spanish literature, and Spanish reading growth and overall progress.

Reliability and validity

The reliability of an assessment is the extent to which scores from the assessment will remain the same between two administrations within a short period. The validity of an assessment is the extent to which the assessment measures what it claims to measure.

A number of other studies have demonstrated the reliability and validity of STAR Reading, STAR Math, and STAR Early Literacy. Additionally, a number of studies have demonstrated the correlation between STAR assessments and other tests of similar skills. As with any assessment or test, however, student scores will vary each time the assessment or test is administered. This concept is called the statistical error of a measurement.

External agencies, like the National Center on Student Progress Monitoring (NCSPM), have assessed the STAR products and found them to be technically sound. Additionally, the Southwest Educational Development Laboratory (SEDL) has categorized STAR Reading and STAR Early Literacy as criterion-referenced and norm-referenced assessments. In this latter case, the STAR Early Literacy package is said to evaluate eight cognitive elements.

STAR Early Literacy was mentioned in the 2006 Readers' Choice Awards: Best Reading Software, a survey by eSchool News.

Criticism
The Illinois State Board of Education (ISBE) stated in a Summer 2005 letter that it would no longer accept STAR Reading scores for measuring reading "performance progress" for the Reading Improvement Block Grant. However, STAR reading was still permitted for instructional decision making. Since the ISBE issued this letter in 2005, the SEDL has updated its database, and ISBE has now re-categorized STAR Reading as an assessment of reading comprehension.

See also
Accelerated Reader
Accelerated Math

References

External links
 

Software for children
Renaissance Learning software
Standardized tests